Adrián Arregui (born 12 August 1992) is an Argentine footballer who currently plays for Club Atlético Huracán on loan from Colombian club Independiente Medellin.

Career

Club
Arregui spent almost four years with Temperley, helping them to promotion to the Argentine Primera División. He signed on loan with Major League Soccer side Montreal Impact on 22 February 2017. Arregui and Montreal mutually terminated the loan agreement on 16 June 2017.

In the summer 2019, Arregui joined Colombian club Independiente Medellín on a one-year loan from Temperley with an option to buy. Independiente Medellín confirmed on 30 December 2019, that they had triggered the option and bought 100% of the Arregui's rights. On 25 July 2020, he joined Huracán on a 18 month-long loan for $100,000 with an option to buy for $1,7 million. However, the spell was cut short, as he on 18 February 2021 instead was transferred to fellow league club Independiente, once again on loan, until the end of the season, with a purchase option. Arregui was recalled in June 2021 due to a meniscal injury, which prevented him from playing, and returned to Independiente Medellín.

References

External links
 
 

1992 births
Living people
Argentine footballers
Argentine expatriate footballers
Association football midfielders
A.D. Berazategui footballers
Club Atlético Temperley footballers
San Martín de Tucumán footballers
CF Montréal players
Independiente Medellín footballers
Club Atlético Huracán footballers
Club Atlético Independiente footballers
Argentine Primera División players
Primera Nacional players
Primera B Metropolitana players
Categoría Primera A players
Major League Soccer players
Argentine expatriate sportspeople in Canada
Expatriate soccer players in Canada
Argentine expatriate sportspeople in Colombia
Expatriate footballers in Colombia
People from Berazategui Partido
Sportspeople from Buenos Aires Province